The 2012 Challenger Ciudad de Guayaquil was a professional tennis tournament played on clay courts. It was the eighth edition of the tournament, which was part of the 2012 ATP Challenger Tour. It took place in Guayaquil, Ecuador between 5 and 10 November 2012.

Singles main draw entrants

Seeds

 1 Rankings are as of October 29, 2012.

Other entrants
The following players received wildcards into the singles main draw:
  Duilio Beretta
  Alejandro Estrada
  Emilio Gómez
  Juan-Sebastian Vivanco

The following players received entry as a special exempt into the singles main draw:
  Juan Sebastián Cabal

The following players received entry from the qualifying draw:
  Sergio Galdós
  Daniel Garza
  Mateo Nicolás Martínez
  Franco Scaravilli

Champions

Singles

 Leonardo Mayer def.  Paolo Lorenzi, 6–2, 6–4

Doubles

 Martín Alund /  Facundo Bagnis def.  Leonardo Mayer /  Martín Ríos-Benítez, 7–5, 7–6(7–5)

External links
Official Website

Challenger Ciudad de Guayaquil
Challenger Ciudad de Guayaquil